Desert Speedtrap Starring Road Runner and Wile E. Coyote is an action game developed by Probe Entertainment, that was released in 1994 for the Master System console and Game Gear color handheld system.

Gameplay
The Road Runner must outwit the Coyote, while maintaining his strength by eating birdseed.

Reception

Five reviewers on Electronic Gaming Monthly scored the Game Gear version an average score 7.4 out of 10, comparing it to an 8-bit version of Road Runner's Death Valley Rally. Four reviewers on GamePro scored the Game Gear version an average score 3.4 out of 5, criticizing its low quality graphics and music and it's hard difficulty. Power Unlimited gave the Game Gear version a score of 78% writing: "Packed with bonus levels, cartoon jokes and well-hidden power-ups. The character of Road Runner comes out very well. Fun, difficult and original."

References

External links

1993 video games
Cartoon Network video games
Game Gear games
Master System games
Platform games
Sega video games
Single-player video games
Video games about birds
Video games based on Looney Tunes
Video games developed in the United Kingdom
Wile E. Coyote and the Road Runner